Georges Koffi (born 8 March 1956) is a boxer from the Republic of Congo, who competed in the welterweight (– 67 kg) division at the 1980 Summer Olympics. Koffi lost his opening bout to John Mugabi of Uganda. He was born in Mindouli, French Congo.

1980 Olympic results
Below is the record of Georges Koffi, a Congolese welterweight boxer who competed at the 1980 Moscow Olympics:

 Round of 32: lost to John Mugabi (Uganda) by knockout

References

1956 births
Living people
People from Pool Department
Welterweight boxers
Olympic boxers of the Republic of the Congo
Boxers at the 1980 Summer Olympics
Republic of the Congo male boxers